Cyperus macrophyllus is a species of sedge that is native to some islands of the Pacific Ocean.

See also 
 List of Cyperus species

References 

macrophyllus
Plants described in 1870
Flora of the Cook Islands
Flora of the Society Islands
Taxa named by Johann Otto Boeckeler